Deon Marshall Thompson (born September 16, 1988) is an American-Ivorian professional basketball player who last played for Tofaş of Basketbol Süper Ligi (BSL). He played college basketball for the North Carolina Tar Heels.

High school and college career
As a senior at Torrance High School in Torrance, California, Thompson scored 30 or more points five times and had 20 or more rebounds on six occasions, and led his team to the Division II-A finals in 2006 and quarterfinals in 2005. He averaged 21.5 points, 13.8 rebounds and 4.6 blocked shots as a senior.

Thompson wore number 21 for North Carolina; when his college career ended in 2010, he had played in a total of 152 games, at that time the most in NCAA Division I men's history. While the record was broken the following season by David Lighty of Ohio State, and is now held by Iowa's Jordan Bohannon, Thompson is now tied with Kentucky's Darius Miller for the most games among players who participated in the standard four seasons.

Professional career
After going undrafted in the 2010 NBA draft, Thompson joined the Minnesota Timberwolves for the 2010 NBA Summer League. On August 1, 2010, he signed with Greek club Ikaros Kallitheas for the  2010–11 season.

On July 20, 2011, Thompson signed a two-year deal with Slovenian club Union Olimpija. With Olimpija he won the 2012 Slovenian Cup. On August 7, 2012, he parted ways with Olimpija.

On August 12, 2012, Thompson signed with German club Alba Berlin for the 2012–13 season. With Alba he won the 2013 German Cup. At the end of the season he was named to the All-BBL First Team.

On August 2, 2013, Thompson signed with Bayern Munich. With Bayern he won the 2013–14 Bundesliga, and was also named to the All-BBL Second Team. On August 14, 2014, he parted ways with Bayern.

On August 26, 2014, Thompson signed with the Liaoning Flying Leopards of China for the 2014–15 CBA season. On March 23, 2015, he signed with Hapoel Jerusalem of the Israeli Premier League for the rest of the season.

On July 20, 2015, Thompson returned to Bayern Munich, signing a one-year deal.

On July 12, 2016, Thompson signed with Galatasaray for the 2016–17 season. On January 2, 2017, he left Galatasaray and signed with Serbian club Crvena zvezda for the rest of the season.

On August 19, 2017, Thompson signed with Spanish club San Pablo Burgos and became the top rebounder of the 2017–18 ACB season with 6.7 rebounds per game. He was also named MVP of the week after performing and average index of 31 in the club wins at MoraBanc Andorra and versus Real Betis Energía Plus. On August 6, 2018, Thompson re-signed for one season with Spanish club San Pablo Burgos.

On January 6, 2019, Thompson left Burgos and signed with Lithuanian Žalgiris Kaunas until the end of the season. He helped Žalgiris reach the EuroLeague playoffs, and win the Lithuanian Basketball League championship.

On October 28, 2021, he has signed with Casademont Zaragoza of the Liga ACB.

On October 14, 2022, he has signed with Tofaş of Basketbol Süper Ligi (BSL).

National team career 
In July 2019, Thompson was listed as a preliminary squad member of the Ivory Coast national team for the 2019 FIBA Basketball World Cup.

Career statistics

EuroLeague

|-
| style="text-align:left;"| 2011–12
| style="text-align:left;"| Union Olimpija
| 10 || 5 || 23.6 || .443 || .000 || .476 || 4.1 || .8 || .3 || .2 || 8.8 || 6.0
|-
| style="text-align:left;"| 2012–13
| style="text-align:left;"| Alba Berlin
| 23 || 22 || 26.6 || .524 || .250 || .792 || 5.4 || .8 || .7 || .7 || 12.0 || 13.6
|-
| style="text-align:left;"| 2013–14
| style="text-align:left;"| Bayern
| 21 || 11 || 18.8 || .454 || .200 || .568 || 4.7 || .5 || .3 || .4 || 7.3 || 7.0
|-
| style="text-align:left;"| 2015–16
| style="text-align:left;"| Bayern
| 10 || 8 || 23.1 || .482 || .000 || .769 || 4.1 || 1.0 || 1.2 || 1.1 || 9.2 || 8.7
|-
| style="text-align:left;"| 2016–17
| style="text-align:left;"| Galatasaray
| 13 || 0 || 11.6 || .500 || .000 || .636 || 2.1 || .7 || .5 || .4 || 4.2 || 4.4
|-
| style="text-align:left;"| 2016–17
| style="text-align:left;"| Crvena zvezda
| 13 || 0 || 10.5 || .561 || .000 || .500 || 1.5 || .5 || .3 || .3 || 4.3 || 4.4
|-
| style="text-align:left;"| 2018–19
| style="text-align:left;"| Žalgiris
| 17 || 0 || 13.8 || .596 || .000 || .571 || 3.1 || .5 || .5 || .4 || 4.7 || 5.8
|- class="sortbottom"
| style="text-align:center;" colspan=2| Career
| 107 || 46 || 18.7 || .499 || .111 || .649 || 3.8 || .7 || .5 || .5 || 7.5 || 7.6

See also
 List of NCAA Division I men's basketball career games played leaders

Footnotes

References

External links
 Deon Thompson at euroleague.net
 Deon Thompson at goheels.com
 

1988 births
Living people
2019 FIBA Basketball World Cup players
ABA League players
Alba Berlin players
American expatriate basketball people in Germany
American expatriate basketball people in Greece
American expatriate basketball people in Israel
American expatriate basketball people in Lithuania
American expatriate basketball people in Serbia
American expatriate basketball people in Slovenia
American expatriate basketball people in Spain
American expatriate basketball people in Turkey
American men's basketball players
Baloncesto Málaga players
Basketball League of Serbia players
Basketball players from Torrance, California
BC Žalgiris players
CB Miraflores players
FC Bayern Munich basketball players
Galatasaray S.K. (men's basketball) players
Greek Basket League players
Hapoel Jerusalem B.C. players
Ikaros B.C. players
Ivorian expatriate basketball people in Spain
Ivorian men's basketball players
KK Crvena zvezda players
KK Olimpija players
Liaoning Flying Leopards players
Liga ACB players
Medalists at the 2009 Summer Universiade
North Carolina Tar Heels men's basketball players
People with acquired Ivorian citizenship
Power forwards (basketball)
Sportspeople from Los Angeles County, California
Tofaş S.K. players
Universiade bronze medalists for the United States
Universiade medalists in basketball